Kulibi is a mountain located 70 kilometers east of Dire Dawa in Oromia Region, Ethiopia.  It is the location of a major shrine to the Archangel Gabriel, and is a pilgrimage site for members of the Ethiopian Orthodox Tewahido Church and is credited with many miracles.  Every year in July and more significantly in January, hundreds of thousands of the faithful travel to St. Gabriel of Kulibi to fulfill religious pledges made to the angel for the granting of prayers and miracles.  The church was built by Ras Makonnen, father of Emperor Haile Selassie, in the early 1900s, and enlarged by the Emperor in the 1950s.

Mountains of Ethiopia
Somali Region